George Ogurek Zimmerman, (October 20, 1935 – May 6, 2019) was a Polish-born American scientist, researcher, inventor, professor of physics and physics department chair at Boston University. Zimmerman achieved his PhD in solid state physics in 1963 at Yale University and came to Boston University in the fall of 1963.

Zimmerman's major contributions in physics include discoveries in Condensed Matter and Solid State Physics, phase transitions at ultra low temperatures, magnetically intercalated graphite compounds, Jahn-Teller materials, and applied superconductivity and modeling.
Zimmerman is also well known for his popular lectures on physics, hands-on advanced laboratory lectures and, a Summer Research Internship Program for High School students.

Zimmerman's accomplishments were highlighted in the 17th edition of Who's Who in the World, the 7th through 10th editions of Who's Who in Science and Engineering, and multiple editions of Who's Who in America published between 1986 and 2016. He resided in Boston, where he enjoyed classical music and photography and pursued his research in physics and history until the end of his life. Zimmerman died at the age of 83 in 2019.

Early life and education 
George Ogurek Zimmerman was born  on October 20, 1935, in Poland. He received his Ph.D. in Physics from Yale University in 1963. His thesis was in experimental low temperature physics.

After a few months as a post-doc with C.T. Lane at Yale, he joined the Physics Department at Boston University His research interests are in Condensed Matter and Solid State Physics. More specifically, some of the topics of interest are phase transitions, some at ultra low temperatures, magnetically intercalated graphite compounds, Jahn-Teller materials, and applied superconductivity and modeling. At Boston University, Zimmerman was department chair for 12 years, chaired the Faculty Council, and was a member and chair of several other influential university committees.

His research collaborations include the Francis Bitter National Magnet Laboratory at MIT, and sabbaticals at Brookhaven National Laboratory, UC San Diego, Leiden University, the Netherlands, Harvard University, Cambridge US, and Imperial College, London.

He was a Member At Large of the Governing Board of the Forum on the History of Physics (FHP) and its Webmaster ad hoc. He conducted many oral history interviews which have been archived at the Niels Bohr Library and Archives at the American Institute of Physics.

He established a Summer Research Internship Program for High School students over 30 years ago.

Biographical Listings

American Men and Women of Science 
Who’s Who in America
Holocaust Survivors   
Who's Who in the East

Academic career

Society memberships
American Physical Society
Materials Research Society 
Society of Sigma Xi 
New York Academy of Sciences 
American Association for the Advancement of Science 
Cryogenic Society of America
Phi Beta Kappa

Discovery
Discovery of low temperature magnetic properties of iron intercalated graphite

Inventions
Zimmerman has developed high temperature superconductor based high current leads, which became the first industrial application of the then newly discovered high temperature ceramic superconductors.
Some of Zimmerman's inventions were granted a patent as listed here (patent number and title):
 5,399,547  Method for increasing the critical current density of high transition temperature superconductors  
 5,376,755  Composite lead for conducting an electric current between 75-80K and 4.5K temperatures  
 5,296,459  Method for making an electrically conductive contact for joining high T.sub .      
 5,131,582  Adhesive metallic alloys and methods of their use  
 5,098,656  Alloys for electrically joining superconductors to themselves, to normal conductors, and to semi-conductors  
 4,966,142  Method for electrically joining superconductors to themselves, to normal conductors, and to semi-conductors

Selected publications
Professor Zimmerman has published more than 100 scientific articles, below are a selected few:

Books
Some of his latest research and studies are in his publications:
 Elastic Anomalies in Jahn-Teller Crystals with Competing Structural Orderings. Journal of Physics: Conference Series 04/2013; 428(1):2033-. 
 Strong Electron Correlation by Virtual Phonon Exchange in Jahn-Teller Crystals. 02/2012. 
 Competition of Structural Orderings in Presence of Magnetic Interactions. 03/2010.
 Giant Dynamic Magnetostriction in Colossal Magnetoresistance Manganites with Single and Double MnO_6, Plenum, New York (1985),03/2001. 
 Magnetic Non-Linearity Caused by Jahn-Teller Distortion Correlation in Manganites.
 Magnetostructural Properties of Colossal Magnetoresistance Manganites Under External Magnetic Fields and Uniaxial Pressure

Lectures
 The 50th Anniversary of the Prediction of Superfluidity of He3

References

1935 births
Yale Graduate School of Arts and Sciences alumni
Boston University faculty
American science writers
American physicists
21st-century American physicists
American inventors
American people of Polish descent
Jewish American scientists
2019 deaths
21st-century American Jews
Fellows of the American Physical Society